Hippotion adelinae is a moth of the  family Sphingidae. It is known from Zambia, Malawi and Mozambique.

References

Hippotion
Moths described in 2005